KZRO (100.1 FM) (also known as Z100fm or The Z-Channel) is an oldies/classic hits/classic rock formatted radio station based in Mount Shasta, California (city of license is Dunsmuir, California).  The owner, general manager, program director and lead on-air talent is Dennis Michaels.

The station, with the slogan "We're in it for the music, not the money," features only two commercial breaks per hour 24/7 on weekdays plus 30 hours of weekend syndicated programming, including:

[FRIDAY] noon-Live From The 60s with The Real Don Steele, 5pm-Live in Concert with Lisa Berigan.

[SATURDAY] 6am-The Car Show, 7am-Time Warp with Bill St. James, 11am-Sammy Hagar's Top Rock Countdown, 12 pm-The Acoustic Storm with Audrey Parets, 1pm-The Classic Hit List with MG Kelly and 4pm-The Classics with Steve Downes.

[SUNDAY] 6am-Hot Rod Radio USA with Wings Kalahan, 8am-Goddard's Gold with Steve Goddard, 11am-Off the Record with Uncle Joe Benson, 12 pm-Get The Led Out with Carol Miller, 1pm-Little Steven's Underground Garage with Little Steven Van Zandt, 3pm-Floydian Slip with Craig Bailey and 4pm-Blues Deluxe with Dave Johnson.

[WEEKDAYS] 6–10am: The Dennis Michaels Dog And Pony Show includes music features, goofy stories, daily listener emails and requests, The Old Farmer's Almanac, The Prime Comedy Cut and Stupid News. Other daily features include Into Tomorrow with Dave Graveline,  Flashback Pop Quiz, A Better Life with Sonjay Gupta, and Lunchtime With The Beatles Monday at noon.
WESTWOOD ONE RADIO NEWS full five minute reports air weekdays at 8am, 10am, noon, 2pm and 5pm. One-minute updates air at the bottom of every hour, 24/7 (weekend times float with programming).

KZRO has been granted a construction permit by the U.S. Federal Communications Commission (FCC) to upgrade to Class C1 at a new transmitter site. The effective radiated power will increase to 13,500 watts, and the antenna height above average terrain will increase to 635 meters. This will cover nearly 225,000 persons in the Redding, California Nielson metro radio market. The station currently covers 195,000 persons in five counties throughout its  coverage area.

As of 2021, KZRO is the only'' local radio station in operations as competing stations KSYC-FM Yreka and KMSJ-LP Mount Shasta signing off for good within the year.  KHWA-FM Weed/Mount Shasta went silent in 2019.  (KSYC and KHWA are now Jefferson Public Radio-owned stations that returned to air in 2022.)

External links
KZRO/Z100FM/Z-CHANNEL Website
Listen Live on 128K stream
Listen On Alexa: To Listen, 'Alexa, Enable Z-Channel Radio Skill'. From that point on, 'Alexa, Listen To Z-Channel Radio

ZRO
Mass media in Siskiyou County, California
Mount Shasta, California (city)
Redding, California
Yreka, California
Classic hits radio stations in the United States
Classic rock radio stations in the United States
1995 establishments in California